Oberle is a surname. Notable people with the surname include:

Emil Oberle (1889–1955), German amateur footballer
Eugene Oberle (1929-2010), American politician
Florence Oberle (1869–1943), American actress
Frank Oberle Sr. (born 1932), Canadian politician
Bruno Oberle (born 1955), Swiss environmentalist
Frank Oberle Jr. (born 1957), Canadian politician